sed is a Unix utility for processing text.

Sed or SED may also refer to:

Science and technology
 Spectral energy distribution, of an astronomical source
 Stochastic electrodynamics, in quantum mechanics
 Sedirea (Sed.), a genus of orchids

Medicine
 Selective eating disorder or avoidant/restrictive food intake disorder
 Spondyloepiphyseal dysplasia congenita, an inherited genetic bone disorder
 Erythrocyte sedimentation rate (sed rate), a haematology test

Technology, engineering and computing
 Surface-conduction electron-emitter display, a flat-panel display technology
 DEC SED (text editor), for some DEC operating systems
 Self-encrypting device, an encrypting hard drive

Organisations
 Socialist Unity Party of Germany, East German communist party
 Swiss Seismological Service

Education
 Scottish Education Department

Companies
 SED Systems, a Canadian satellite communications provider
 Tata Power SED, Tata Power Strategic Electronics Division

Other uses
 Survey of English Dialects
 Strategic Economic Dialogue
 Sed card, a "portfolio-on-a-card" used by models and actors
 Sed festival, in Ancient Egypt
 Shippers Export Declaration, a US form

See also

 
 
 Students for the Exploration and Development of Space (SEDS)